R. Clayton 'Clay' Mitchell Jr. (April 16, 1936 – June 13, 2019) was an American politician and the Speaker of the Maryland House of Delegates in the United States.

Background
Mitchell was born in Chestertown on Maryland's Eastern Shore in 1936. He served in the United States Army before entering public service in the 1966 elections.

Political career
In 1962, Mitchell won a seat on the Democratic Central Committee in Kent County Maryland. In the 1966 elections, Mitchell won a seat on the Kent County Commissioners. He was President of the Kent County Commissioners for 4 years. Four years later (1970), he won election to the Maryland House of Delegates representing District 36, which spreads across the northern Eastern Shore between the Delaware state line and the Chesapeake Bay. He became chair of the Eastern Shore delegation in 1974, and a decade later took over as chairman of the powerful Appropriations Committee. In 1987, after the election of the previous Speaker of the Maryland House of Delegates, Benjamin L. Cardin, to Congress, Mitchell was elected by his colleagues to serve as Speaker. He held the position until his retirement in 1994.

Retirement
After retiring from the House of Delegates, Mitchell continued to be actively involved in his community. He chaired both the Save Our Skipjacks Task Force and the Maryland Commission for Celebration 2000. In addition, he was a Director of the Second National Bank of Maryland and a member of the Board of Visitors and Governors of Washington College. Mitchell died on June 13, 2019.

Legacy 
In 2008, the R. Clayton Mitchell Jr. Kent County Government Center in Chestertown was dedicated to Mitchell. In 2018, the Kent Narrows Bridge on US 50/US 301 was also dedicated in his name. In October, 2019, the Comptroller of Maryland established the R. Clayton Mitchell Award for Distinguished Public Service to recognize officials at all levels of government for exceptional public service.

References

1936 births
2019 deaths
People from Chestertown, Maryland
Military personnel from Maryland
Businesspeople from Maryland
County commissioners in Maryland
Speakers of the Maryland House of Delegates
Democratic Party members of the Maryland House of Delegates
20th-century American businesspeople